Jericho Moon is a 1998 fantasy novel by American author Matthew Stover.  The sequel to his first book, Iron Dawn, the story follows the adventures of three Bronze Age mercenaries who are hired to defend the city of Jericho from the Israelites.

American fantasy novels

1998 American novels
1998 fantasy novels
Roc Books books